Peter Alsop (born September 18, 1946) is an American musician whose work has ranged from satirical music for adults to children's music.

Biography
Alsop was born in 1946 in Connecticut and raised in an alcoholic family. He graduated from Trinity College, with a BA in Religion in 1968, Columbia University Teachers College, and Columbia Pacific University with a PhD. in educational psychology. He worked as the Director of The Harbor Schools Residential Treatment Center for emotionally disturbed adolescents in Maine, and as a New York City elementary school teacher in the South Bronx. He married actress Ellen Geer in 1975; they live in Topanga, CA, and have two daughters, artist/photographer Megan Geer-Alsop and actress Willow.
Megan and Chad Scheppner are parents to Quinnlyn and Leon. Willow and Mat Polin have two children, Julius and Luther. Polin's stepson Ian Flanders, fathered his grandson, Liam Flanders.

Career

Alsop has been producing children's, educational and humorous music since 1975. He received a Parents' Choice Award for his 2010 album Grow It At Home.

Discography
 Peter Alsop (1975)
 Asleep at the Helm (1977)
 Draw the Line (1980)
 Uniforms (1981)
 Wha'D'Ya Wanna do!? (1983)
 Fan Club Favorites (1985)
 Take Me with You! (1986)
 Stayin' Over (1987)
 In The Hospital (1989) w. Bill Harley
 Family Roles (1991)
 Pluggin' Away (1991)
 Chris Moose Holidays (1994)
 Songs on Loss & Grief (1997)
 Songs on Recovery & Addiction (1997)
 Songs on Sex & Sexuality (1997)
 Did You Walk? (2001)
 Uh-Oh! (2002)
 Ebenezer's Make-over (2004)
 Disciples Of PerFection (2010)
 Grow It At Home (2010)
 River Of Life (2014)
 Camping With Dads (2020)

Videography
 Here We Go Volume 1 (1987)
 Opening Doors (1988)
 Costume Party (1988)
 Wake Up (1992)
 When Jesus Was a Kid (1993)
 Get Real! (1995)
 When Kids Say Goodbye (1995)
 After Romeo (1998)
 Sometimes Si, Sometimes No! (2007)

See also
Bill Harley

References

External links

 
 

1946 births
Living people
American children's musicians
Trinity College (Connecticut) alumni
Teachers College, Columbia University alumni
Columbia Pacific University alumni